Ivan Lendl was the defending champion but did not play in the tournament.

Seeds

  Michael Stich (third round)
  Pete Sampras (quarterfinals)
  Michael Chang (third round)
  David Wheaton (third round)
  Brad Gilbert (third round)
  Derrick Rostagno (second round)
  Wayne Ferreira (finalist)
  Andrei Chesnokov (second round)
  Aaron Krickstein (quarterfinals)
  Richey Reneberg (third round)
  Horst Skoff (second round)
  Francisco Clavet (second round)
  MaliVai Washington (champion)
  Paul Haarhuis (quarterfinals)
  Cristiano Caratti (second round)
  Jimmy Connors (semifinals)

Draw

Finals

Top half

Section 1

Section 2

Bottom half

Section 3

Section 4

References

External links
 ATP main draw

U.S. National Indoor Championships
1992 ATP Tour